Ksour-el-Maïete is a set of ruins in Tunisia near the Cherita and the Sebkhet de Sidi El Hani lakes.

The ruins date from the Roman Empire and are tentatively identified as a station on the Roman Road from Althiburos To Thysdrus. According to one interpretation of the Antonine Itinerary, it is the site known in the Roman era as Germaniciana.

References

Roman towns and cities in Tunisia
Sousse Governorate